Timothy Robert Noah (born 1958), an American journalist and author, is a staff writer at The New Republic. Previously he was labor policy editor for Politico, a contributing writer at MSNBC.com, a senior editor of The New Republic assigned to write the biweekly "TRB From Washington" column, and a senior writer at Slate, where for a decade he wrote the "Chatterbox" column. In April 2012, Noah published a book, The Great Divergence, about income inequality in the United States.

Early life and education
Noah is the son of Marian Jane (née Swentor) and Robert M. Noah, a television producer. He grew up in New Rochelle, New York, and Beverly Hills, California.  His father was Jewish, and his mother was Protestant; he describes himself as an atheist. He is a graduate of Harvard College, where he obtained a degree in English in 1980, and where he was on the prose board of the Harvard Advocate. He lives in Washington, D.C.

Career
Earlier in his career, Noah was an assistant managing editor at U.S. News & World Report, a Washington reporter for The Wall Street Journal, an intern and then staff writer at The New Republic, and a congressional correspondent for Newsweek. Noah is a contributing editor to The Washington Monthly, where he was an editor (1983–85), and where he returned for six weeks as guest web editor in the summer of 2021. He has been a frequent broadcast commentator on CBS News' Sunday Morning and NPR's former program, Day To Day. 

On February 24, 2007, Noah wrote an article for Slate entitled "Evicted from Wikipedia", which critiques the online encyclopedia's notability policy as an illustration of our society's "love affair with invidious distinction," and cited Thorstein Veblen's 1899 critique of consumerism, The Theory of the Leisure Class to this effect.

In 2010, Noah was a National Magazine Award finalist in the online news reporting category for his Slate coverage of the health care reform bill.

The Great Divergence grew out of a ten-part series that Noah published in Slate in September 2010. The series won the 2011 Hillman Prize in the magazine category, and was the first online-only work ever to do so. Writing on Page One of the New York Times Book Review, the Harvard economist Benjamin Friedman called the book "as fair and comprehensive a summary as we are likely to get of what economists have learned about our growing inequality." The book also won praise from Nicholas Lemann in the New Yorker, Andrew Hacker in the New York Review of Books, and William Julius Wilson in the Nation.

On March 22, 2013, Noah announced over Twitter that he'd been fired by The New Republic. He said he didn't know why.  Editor Franklin Foer said "Tim Noah has been a strong voice for liberalism and a rigorous columnist for The New Republic. We’ve appreciated his passion and contribution to the magazine over the past two years and wish him the very best." Noah started freelancing a weekly column for the magazine again in 2020, and in September 2021 he rejoined the staff.

Iraq War
In a February 2003 article in Slate, Noah described his initial opposition to the Iraq War and his conversion to the pro-war position by Colin Powell's February 3 speech to the United Nations. After many of Powell's statements were proven false, Noah changed his mind again about the war, praising those who had remained steadfastly against it in an August 2004 column. After that, he became an outspoken critic of the media's ongoing tendency to grant credibility to war boosters, while discounting the views of those who opposed the war from the start.

Personal life
In September 2018 Noah married Sarah McNamer, a medievalist and professor of English at Georgetown University. 

Noah's first wife, fellow journalist Marjorie Williams, died of cancer in 2005. After her death, Noah edited an anthology of Williams' writing, The Woman at the Washington Zoo: Writings on Politics, Family, and Fate. The book won PEN's Martha Albrand Award for First Nonfiction and a National Magazine Award in the category of essays and criticism.  A second Williams anthology, Reputation: Portraits in Power was published in October 2008.

Noah has two children and two stepchildren. His brother is television writer/producer Peter Noah. His sister, Patsy Noah, co-founded the charity Your Mom Cares. Maroon 5 frontman Adam Levine is his nephew.

Selected appearances on CBS News's Sunday Morning
"Income Immobility in the U.S.," March 17, 2013
"Ban the Benjamins!," April 3, 2011
"The Great Divergence" October 24, 2010
"Why the Filibuster Deserves No Respect," March 14, 2010
"Celebrity Commencements," May 24, 2009
"Let Us Now 'Change' The Campaign Rhetoric," September 7, 2008

References

External links
 Author Web site (timothynoah.com)
 Recent articles
 MSNBC articles
 New Republic articles
 Slate articles, by year
 Video (with audio-only available) conversations with Noah on Bloggingheads.tv
 NPR appearances and commentaries
 Marjorie Williams Web site
 

American atheists
American male journalists
American people of Jewish descent
Harvard College alumni
Living people
Place of birth missing (living people)
The New Republic people
Slate (magazine) people
1958 births
Writers from New Rochelle, New York
Journalists from New York (state)
Harvard Advocate alumni